Steinbach's canastero (Pseudasthenes steinbachi) or the chestnut canastero, is a species of bird in the canastero genus Asthenes in the ovenbird family Furnariidae. It is endemic to western Argentina.

References

Steinbach's canastero
Endemic birds of Argentina
Steinbach's canastero
Taxonomy articles created by Polbot